The surname Tolman may refer to:

Aiden Tolman (born 1988), Australian Rugby League player
Andrew Tolman (born 1986), American drummer, co-founder of alternative rock groups Imagine Dragons and The Moth & The Flame
Brett Tolman (born 1970), United States Attorney involved in Patriot Act reauthorization and controversy over dismissal of U.S. attorneys
Chadwick A. Tolman (born 1938), 1970s duPont research chemist after whom the Tolman cone angle and Tolman electronic parameter are named
Charles E. Tolman (1903–1943), posthumous US Navy Cross recipient after whom USS Tolman was named
Edgar Bronson Tolman (1859–1947), president of Illinois State Bar Association and editor-in-chief of American Bar Association Journal
Edward C. Tolman (1886–1959), American psychologist
James E. Tolman (1867–1956), Massachusetts lawyer and state representative
Marije Tolman (born 1976), Dutch illustrator of children's literature
Richard C. Tolman (1881–1948), American mathematical physicist and physical chemist
Russ Tolman (born 1956), American guitarist, co-founder of Paisley Underground band True West
Steven Tolman (born 1952), president of the Massachusetts AFL–CIO and former state senator
Susan Tolman, American mathematician
Teun Tolman (1924–2007), Dutch politician
Tim Tolman (1956–2021), Major League Baseball outfielder
Warren Tolman (born 1959), former Massachusetts senator and state representative